Margarita María de Santa Teresita Vargas Gaviria better known by her stage name Margarita La Diosa de la Cumbia, is a Colombian-Mexican singer.

References

Living people
21st-century Colombian women singers
Universal Music Latin Entertainment artists
Musicians from Medellín
Colombian expatriates in Mexico
Year of birth missing (living people)
20th-century Colombian women singers
Women in Latin music